Dream FM Network was a radio network in the Philippines. It was founded in September 2004 as a radio arm of ABC Development Corporation (now TV5 Network, Inc.), and later on Interactive Broadcast Media.

Dream FM Network shut down its national network in June 2011, with its Manila flagship station currently operated by Ultrasonic Broadcasting System as Energy FM. It currently operates DYKP as Boracay Beach Radio.

History
In September 2004, 11 months after Cojuangco took over the management of ABC, 106.7 was reformatted as Dream FM. The station aired in a smooth jazz format added up with R&B, Soul, Bossa Nova and House. The station branding was named after Dream Satellite TV, also owned by Cojuangco.

After PLDT's media subsidiary MediaQuest Holdings, Inc. acquired TV5 and its affiliate ABC television stations from the consortium led by the Cojuangco group and Malaysia-based broadcaster Media Prima Berhad in March 2010, Dream FM and its regional stations were spun off to become Dream FM Network, led by former ABC stockholder Anton Lagdameo. The ownership of the stations were transferred to Interactive Broadcast Media, after Cojuangco acquired a non-controlling share of the company.

Dream FM Manila signed off at June 30, 2011, with the song, "Till We Meet Again" by Eric Benét. Its provincial stations were shut down a month before. In August 2011, it resumed its broadcast online through Hayag, but ceased its broadcast a few months later. In September 2011, Dream FM Boracay was rechristened as Boracay Beach Radio. On its website, it is described as a "part of the Dream FM Network".

Energy FM Manila transferred to 106.7 on July 1, 2011. The station is referred to as "Energy FM on Dream". This is a temporary partnership between Cojuangco and Ultrasonic Broadcasting System, which took part-ownership of the station.

Stations

Current

Former

References

External links
Dream FM Online
97.3 Boracay Beach Radio 

TV5 Network
TV5 (Philippine TV network)
Radio stations in the Philippines
Defunct radio stations in the Philippines
Radio stations established in 2004
Radio stations disestablished in 2011